Florian Metz (born 18 September 1985) is an Austrian football coach and former player who works a physiotherapist with Austria Wien. A defender, he notably played for Austria Wien and LASK.

Club career

Austria Wien
Metz is one of the first graduates of the Frank Stronach Academy. He played at the Austria Wien first team from 2004 until 2009, when he left for LASK Linz.

LASK Linz

Career statistics

Honours
 Austrian Football Bundesliga: 2006
 Austrian Cup: 2005, 2006, 2007, 2009

References

External links
Player profile - Austria Wien

Living people
1985 births
People from Zwettl
Footballers from Lower Austria
Austrian footballers
Association football defenders
FK Austria Wien players
LASK players
FC Liefering players
Austrian Football Bundesliga players
2. Liga (Austria) players
Austrian Regionalliga players